Liang Shuquan (September 17, 1912 – December 9, 2006) was a Chinese chemist. He was a member of the Chinese Academy of Sciences.

References 

1912 births
2006 deaths
Members of the Chinese Academy of Sciences